Novi Žednik (Serbian Cyrillic: Нови Жедник) is a village located in the Subotica municipality, in the North Bačka District of Serbia. It is situated in the autonomous province of Vojvodina. The village has a Serb ethnic majority and its population numbering 2,848 people (2002 census). The village contains an elementary school, an old Orthodox church and a newly build Orthodox church as well a train station. The village has a Catholic minority who attend religious services in nearby village of Stari Žednik since there are no Catholic churches in this village.

Name
In Serbian the settlement is known as Novi Žednik (Нови Жедник), in Bunjevac as Novi Žednik, in Hungarian as Újnagyfény, and in Croatian as Novi Žednik. Sometimes, it is known simply as Žednik (Жедник).

Ethnic groups (2002)

Serbs = 1,805 (63.38%)
Bunjevci = 398 (13.98%)
Hungarians = 240 (8.43%)
Croats = 206 (7.23%)
Yugoslavs = 44 (1.55%)
Montenegrins = 35 (1.23%)

Historical population

1961: 6,931
1971: 6,090
1981: 3,195
1991: 2,932
2011: 2,399

Famous people

 Živko Slijepčević (Retired football player; Coach)

 Stuberi (Group of YouTubers)

References

Slobodan Ćurčić, Broj stanovnika Vojvodine, Novi Sad, 1996.

See also
List of places in Serbia
List of cities, towns and villages in Vojvodina

Places in Bačka
Subotica